Integrity testing may refer to:
 Employment integrity testing
 Foundation integrity testing